Rajiv Ramon van La Parra (born 4 June 1991) is a Dutch professional footballer. A winger, he can also play as a striker. At international level, he has represented the Netherlands U21.

Van La Parra played his first senior games in France with Caen before returning to the Netherlands in 2011 for a three-season-long stay with SC Heerenveen. In June 2014, he moved to England to join Wolverhampton Wanderers, who loaned him to Brighton & Hove Albion and Huddersfield Town before he joined the latter in 2016.

Club career

Caen

Van La Parra is a product of the Feyenoord youth system, but made his senior debut instead for French Ligue 1 club Caen on 8 November 2008, having agreed a four-year contract in June 2008. He cited the potential to reach the highest level while playing in France as the reason for his transfer.

The right winger made only two appearances for Caen's first team during his first season, and the club ended the campaign being relegated. Despite this relegation, Van La Parra would make only a further eight appearances as the team won promotion back to the top flight, but did register his first senior goal; against Guingamp on 5 April 2009. During these seasons, he instead gained playing time in Caen's second team that competed in the Championnat de France amateur.

SC Heerenveen
In summer 2011, his contract was terminated and he returned to the Netherlands in search of a new club. After an unsuccessful trial at AZ Alkmaar, he eventually signed a one-year contract with fellow Eredivisie side SC Heerenveen on 30 August 2011. After scoring six times during 26 appearances in his debut season, Heerenveen elected to take up an option in his contract for two further seasons. Over these three seasons, Van La Parra made 94 appearances (including playing in the Europa League), scoring 16 times.

Wolverhampton Wanderers
His contract from Heerenveen expired in the summer of 2014, and after rejecting a new contract, on 10 June it was announced that he would move to English Championship side Wolverhampton Wanderers, with whom he had signed a three-year contract. He made his debut in the first match on 10 August 2014 against Norwich City, and was named man of the match. He scored his first goal for Wolves against Fulham in the FA Cup on 13 January 2015. His first league goal came against future club Brighton & Hove Albion in a 1–1 draw on 14 March 2015.

On 26 November 2015, Van La Parra signed a loan deal with Brighton, lasting until 2 January 2016.

Huddersfield Town
On 11 March 2016, after some speculation, Van La Parra signed on loan for fellow Championship side Huddersfield Town for the rest of the season, with the move becoming a permanent deal in the summer, on a three-year contract. He made his debut for the Terriers in the 4–1 West Yorkshire derby win against Leeds United at Elland Road on 19 March, and scored his first goal in their 1–0 win over his former club Wolves at the Kirklees Stadium on 27 August.
Van La Parra was an instrumental part of the Huddersfield Town side that was promoted to the Premier League in the 2016–17 season. He was then a regular as Huddersfield went on to survive relegation in the following season. After falling out of favour following Huddersfield's relegation, Van La Parra made it known he wished to leave the club.

Red Star Belgrade and Logroñés
On 31 August 2019, Van La Parra signed a three-year contract with Serbian club Red Star Belgrade in a €1.2 million transfer from Huddersfield Town.

On 16 November 2020, free agent van La Parra signed a one-year deal with Spanish Segunda División side UD Logroñés. He was released from his contract on 31 January 2021, having made four appearances for the side.

Würzburger Kickers
Van La Parra joined 2. Bundesliga club Würzburger Kickers on a free transfer on 1 February 2021, a day after being released by Logroñes.

Personal life
Born in the Netherlands, Van La Parra is of Surinamese descent.  One of his half-brothers, Georginio Wijnaldum, currently plays for AS Roma, while another, Giliano Wijnaldum, is a free agent. His cousin, Giovanni Drenthe, is also a professional footballer, playing for SV Excelsior in Suriname, while another, Royston Drenthe, came out of retirement and now plays for Racing Murcia.

Career statistics

Honours
Huddersfield Town
EFL Championship play-offs: 2017

References

External links

Voetbal International profile 

francefootball.fr 
Netherlands stats at OnsOranje

1991 births
Living people
Footballers from Rotterdam
Dutch footballers
Netherlands youth international footballers
Netherlands under-21 international footballers
Association football wingers
Association football forwards
Feyenoord players
SC Heerenveen players
Stade Malherbe Caen players
Wolverhampton Wanderers F.C. players
Brighton & Hove Albion F.C. players
Huddersfield Town A.F.C. players
Middlesbrough F.C. players
Red Star Belgrade footballers
UD Logroñés players
Würzburger Kickers players
Apollon Smyrnis F.C. players
Eredivisie players
Ligue 1 players
Ligue 2 players
Premier League players
English Football League players
Segunda División players
2. Bundesliga players
Super League Greece players
Dutch expatriate footballers
Expatriate footballers in France
Dutch expatriate sportspeople in France
Expatriate footballers in England
Dutch expatriate sportspeople in England
Dutch expatriate sportspeople in Serbia
Expatriate footballers in Spain
Dutch expatriate sportspeople in Spain
Expatriate footballers in Germany
Dutch expatriate sportspeople in Germany
Dutch sportspeople of Surinamese descent